Valeri Georgiyevich Nenenko (born 30 March 1950) is a Russian professional football coach and a former player.

External links
 Career summary at KLISF

Soviet footballers
FC Fakel Voronezh players
FC Mariupol players
Soviet football managers
Russian football managers
FC Fakel Voronezh managers
FC Chernomorets Novorossiysk managers
FC Rotor Volgograd managers
Russian Premier League managers
FC Metallurg Lipetsk players
1950 births
Living people
Association football forwards
FC Iskra Smolensk players